Esmailabad-e Pain (also Romanized as Esmā‘īlābād-e Pā’īn; also known as Esma‘īlābād, Esmā’īlābād, Esmā‘īlābād-e Korbāl, and Esma‘īlābād Korbal) is a village in Sofla Rural District, in the Central District of Kharameh County, Fars Province, Iran. At the 2006 census, its population was 278, in 60 families.

References 

Populated places in Kharameh County